Joaquín 'Ximo' Navarro Armero (born 12 September 1988) is a Spanish professional footballer who plays as a right-back or right midfielder for CD Acero.

Club career
Born in Valencia, Navarro joined hometown Valencia CF's youth ranks in early 2005, then spent the following years with the reserves, helping them return to the Segunda División B in his first season. He started his career as a right-back.

Navarro made his first-team debut in late 2008, appearing in both legs against lowly Club Portugalete in the Copa del Rey's round-of-32, a 7–1 aggregate win. For the 2009–10 campaign, he was loaned by coach Unai Emery to neighbouring Elche CF in the Segunda División.

After leaving the Mestalla Stadium on 30 June 2011, Navarro resumed his career in the Super League Greece, where he represented a host of clubs. On 4 January 2018, Athlitiki Enosi Larissa F.C. released the 29-year-old.

References

External links

1988 births
Living people
Spanish footballers
Footballers from Valencia (city)
Association football defenders
Association football midfielders
Segunda División players
Segunda División B players
Tercera División players
Tercera Federación players
Valencia CF Mestalla footballers
Valencia CF players
Elche CF players
CF Torre Levante players
Atlético Saguntino players
Super League Greece players
Football League (Greece) players
Asteras Tripolis F.C. players
AEL Kalloni F.C. players
Levadiakos F.C. players
Trikala F.C. players
Athlitiki Enosi Larissa F.C. players
Spanish expatriate footballers
Expatriate footballers in Greece
Spanish expatriate sportspeople in Greece